Hegel Audio AS is a manufacturer of High fidelity audio equipment, based in Oslo, Norway. The company is best known for its audio amplifiers. A large proportion of the production is exported all around the world. All Hegel production is designed in Norway but produced in China.

References

Audio equipment manufacturers of Norway